Tamil Nadu Forward Bloc was a political party in Tamil Nadu, India. The party was founded in 1981 through the merger of National Forward Bloc and Pasumpon Forward Bloc of Ayyanan Ambalam, following a split from the National Forward Bloc (NFB).

In 1983, the party suffered a severe split. One section of the party rallied around P.K. Muthuramalinga Thevar and formed the Democratic Forward Bloc. Another group, led by K. Kandasamy broke away and formed the All India Forward Bloc (Kandasamy). The rump TNFB was led by Ayyanan Ambalam.

Sources
Bose, K., Forward Bloc, Madras: Tamil Nadu Academy of Political Science, 1988.

Defunct political parties in Tamil Nadu
1981 establishments in Tamil Nadu
Political parties established in 1981
Political parties with year of disestablishment missing
All India Forward Bloc